Camille Rewinds is a 2012 French drama film directed by Noémie Lvovsky. The film was screened in the Directors' Fortnight section at the 2012 Cannes Film Festival where it won the Prix SACD. Yolande Moreau received a Magritte Award for Best Supporting Actress for her role.

Plot
On her way to a party Camille consults a quirky clockmaker because she needs to have her watch fixed. The watch has sentimental value for her because she got it as a present for her 16th birthday. Next morning Camille realises it is the year 1985 and she is again a teenager.

Cast

 Noémie Lvovsky as Camille Vaillant
 Samir Guesmi as Éric
 Judith Chemla as Josepha
 India Hair as Alice
 Julia Faure as Louise
 Yolande Moreau as Camille's mother
 Michel Vuillermoz as Camille's father
 Denis Podalydès as Alphonse Da Costa, the physics professor
 Jean-Pierre Léaud as Monsieur Dupont, the clock-maker
 Vincent Lacoste as Vincent
 Anne Alvaro as The English teacher, whom Camille or her friend ask to adopt her
 Mathieu Amalric as The French teacher (sadist or mean)
 Micha Lescot, the drama teacher and director of the play 
 Riad Sattouf as The director
 Esther Garrel as Mathilde

Reception
The movie received mixed reviews from critics. Review aggregator Rotten Tomatoes reports that 60% of 5 critics gave the film a positive review, for an average rating of 5/10.

References

External links
 

2012 films
2012 drama films
French drama films
2010s French-language films
Films set in 1985
Films directed by Noémie Lvovsky
Gaumont Film Company films
2010s French films